The 1981–82 Israel State Cup (Gvia HaMedina) was the 43rd season of Israel's nationwide football cup competition and the 28th after the Israeli Declaration of Independence.

The competition was won by Hapoel Yehud who have beaten Hapoel Tel Aviv 1–0 in the final.

Results

Fifth Round

Sixth Round

Seventh Round

Round of 16

Quarter-finals

Semi-finals

Final

References
100 Years of Football 1906-2006, Elisha Shohat (Israel), 2006, pp. 256-7
Three upsets in the fifth round of the State Cup Davar, 13.12.1981, Historical Jewish Press 
Cup (Pages 3-4) Hadshot HaSport, 27.12.1981, archive.football.co.il 
Cup (Page 6) Hadshot HaSport, 31.12.1981, archive.football.co.il 
Cup (Pages 2-6) Hadshot HaSport, 21.2.1982, archive.football.co.il 
Cup (Page 7) Hadshot HaSport, 24.2.1982, archive.football.co.il 
Cup (Page 2) Hadshot HaSport, 25.2.1982, archive.football.co.il 

Israel State Cup
State Cup
Israel State Cup seasons